The Estonian Democratic Labour Party (EDTE) was a social-democratic political party in Estonia (then the Estonian SSR). The party was founded in February 1989. The party was led by Vello Saatpalu. In June 1989, the party sent a delegation to the Socialist International congress in Stockholm.

On September 8, 1989, the party merged into the Estonian Social Democratic Party.

References

1989 disestablishments in Estonia
1989 establishments in Estonia
Defunct political parties in Estonia
Defunct social democratic parties
Labour parties
Political parties disestablished in 1989
Political parties established in 1989
Social democratic parties in the Soviet Union
Socialist parties in Estonia